The Australian Prime Minister's Literary Awards (PMLA) were announced at the end of 2007 by the incoming First Rudd ministry following the 2007 election. They are administered by the Minister for the Arts.

The awards were designed as "a new initiative celebrating the contribution of Australian literature to the nation's cultural and intellectual life." The awards are held annually and initially provided a tax-free prize of A$100,000 in each category, making it Australia's richest literary award in total. In 2011, the prize money was split into $80,000 for each category winner and $5,000 for up to four short-listed entries. The award was initially given in four categories – fiction, non-fiction, young adult and children's fiction – as selected by three judging panels. In 2012, a poetry category was added and the former Prime Minister's Prize for Australian History was incorporated into the award. To be eligible, writers "must be a citizen or permanent resident of Australia."

History 
For the inaugural 2008 awards, six Australians were appointed by the Minister for the Environment, Heritage and the Arts to the judging panels: three each for the fiction and non-fiction awards. The final decisions on the shortlist and winners for the awards was made by Prime Minister (Kevin Rudd) based on the judging panels' recommendations.

Two new award categories were announced on 30 March 2010: "young adults' fiction" and "children's fiction." The prize for both new awards was also $100,000; its entries were judged by one judging panel.

Entries for the 2011 awards opened in January 2011 and an annual timetable was implemented: the shortlist was announced in late May and winners in early July. The awards were restructured to provide greater recognition for shortlisted authors. In each category, the winning book was awarded $80,000; $5,000 was awarded to up to four shortlisted titles. The eligibility criteria were extended to include e-books, and wordless picture books were eligible in the children's fiction category. The panellists from 2010 were returned for 2011.

In 2012, a new award for poetry was announced and the Prize for Australian History was incorporated.

Winners

Winners and shortlists

Australian history

Children's fiction

Fiction

Nonfiction

Poetry

Young adult fiction

Notes

References

External links

Australian fiction awards
Australian children's literary awards
Australian non-fiction book awards
Awards established in 2007
Prime Minister of Australia
2007 establishments in Australia
Australian history awards